Bambang Permadi Soemantri Brodjonegoro is an Indonesian economist. He was the Minister of Research and Technology/National Research and Innovation Agency of Republic of Indonesia. Previously, he was the Minister of National Development Planning of Indonesia, taking office after a cabinet reshuffle by President Joko Widodo

From 27 October 2014 to 27 July 2016, he was the Finance Minister of Indonesia in the Working Cabinet also under President Joko Widodo's administration .

Under Susilo Bambang Yudhoyono's administration, he was the Deputy of Finance Minister in the Second United Indonesia Cabinet.

Early life
Born at Jakarta, he is the son of Professor Sumantri Brodjoneogoro, a former Rector of University of Indonesia and Minister of Education and Culture in 1973. Bambang Brodjonegoro completed his study at Economics Faculty of Universitas Indonesia in 1990. The next year, Bambang studied for a master's degree at the University of Illinois at Urbana–Champaign, United States, continuing on to doctoral program completed in 1997.

Career
As an academician, he began his career as a lecturer at University of Indonesia to become the Dean of the Faculty of Economics, University of Indonesia. In 2009, he became the Director-General of the Islamic Research and Training Institute (IRTI), Islamic Development Bank Group, located in Jeddah, The Kingdom of Saudi Arabia. After a 2 years as The Director-General of IRTI, he was appointed as The Chairman of The Fiscal Policy Agency, Ministry of Finance, The Republic of Indonesia in 2011. He then was then promoted as the Vice-Minister of Finance during Susilo Bambang Yudoyono’s presidency.

In October 2014, he was inaugurated as Finance Minister in President Joko Widodo’s first cabinet. During his tenure, he initiated Indonesia’s first Tax Amnesty scheme. Bambang Brodjonegoro also designed an improved budget spending by allocating the very first direct-transfer to all 74,000 villages in Indonesia.

On 23 October 2019, he was appointed as Minister of Research and Technology, a post he was co-held with Head of National Research and Innovation Agency, in pursuant of Presidential Decision No. 113/P/2019. He hold the post until April 2021. On 9 April 2021, Bambang Brodjonegoro announced his departure in one event at Hasanuddin University told the audience the visit will be the last event he attended on his capacity as the Minister and Head of BRIN. On 10 April 2021, Bambang Brodjonegoro reported resigned from his positions as the Minister and Head of BRIN. On 28 April 2021, Nadiem Makarim was inaugurated as the new minister for Ministry of Education, Culture, Research and Technology, and Laksana Tri Handoko was appointed as new Head of National Research and Innovation Agency, effectively ending the ministry and his time as minister.

After no longer become minister, Bambang Brodjonegoro established his own executive office to manage his post ministerial activities and disseminating his works and thoughts around May 2021. He returned into academia and become Head of the Council of Professors of Faculty of Economy and Business University of Indonesia shortly after that. He also appointed and trusted to become independent commissioner in national companies such as Bukalapak (appointed 1 May 2021), Telkom (appointed 28 May 2021), Astra International (appointed 17 June 2021), TBS Energi Utama (appointed 18 June 2021), Oligo Infrastructure (appointed 1 July 2021), and Indofood (appointed 27 August 2021).

Honors and awards

Scholarships and fellowships 

 Mahasiswa Berprestasi Universitas Indonesia (University of Indonesia Outstanding Students Award) (1989).
 Academic Scholarship awarded by the Indonesian Government - HED (August 1991 - December 1995).
 Visiting Fellow, The Institute of East Asian Studies, Thammasat University, Thailand (1999).
 ISEAS-World Bank Research Fellowship Award (as Visiting Research Fellow), The Institute of Southeast Asian Studies, Singapore (1999).
 Eisenhower Fellowships, The Single Region Program – Southeast Asia, USA (2002).
 Visiting Fellow, The Indonesia Project – Australian National University (ANU), Canberra, Australia (2004).

Awards 

 Bintang Mahaputera Utama (3rd class) (2014)
 Ganesa Prajamanggala Bakti Adiutama from Bandung Institute of Technology (2018)
 Madhuri and Jagdish N. Sheth International Alumni Award for Exceptional Achievement from University of Illinois Urbana-Champaign (2020)

Honorary degree 
On 3 July 2021, Bandung Institute of Technology (ITB) awarded honorary degree on occasion of 101 years anniversary event to Bambang Brodjonegoro. He was one of three people awarded by ITB in auspicious occasion. He awarded with doctor honoris causa degree in Urban Planning. Together with him, Sam Bimbo [id], an Islamic religious musician, and I Nyoman Nuarta [id], the chief architect of Garuda Wisnu Kencana statue and Garuda Wisnu Kencana Cultural Park, also awarded doctor honoris causa degree with Sam Bimbo in Music, and I Nyoman Nuarta in Fine Arts, respectively. Bambang Brodjonegoro is only awardee who is not ITB alumni on that occasion, while two others are alumni of ITB. (Sam Bimbo and I Nyoman Nuarta were from Faculty of Fine Arts, with Sam Bimbo graduated in 1968, and I Nyoman Nuarta graduated in 1979).

References

|-

|-

1966 births
Living people
Indonesian Muslims
Finance Ministers of Indonesia
Government ministers of Indonesia
20th-century Indonesian economists
Politicians from Jakarta
University of Illinois Urbana-Champaign alumni
University of Indonesia alumni
Working Cabinet (Joko Widodo)
Onward Indonesia Cabinet
21st-century Indonesian economists